Gregory David Schneemann is a South African politician who has represented the African National Congress (ANC) in the Gauteng Provincial Legislature since August 2020. He formerly served in the national Parliament from 1994 to 2014. In 2022, he was elected to a five-year term as a member of the Provincial Executive Committee of the ANC's Gauteng branch.

Political career 

Schneeman joined the ANC in 1995 and is the son of Maureen Schneemann, a local ANC politician in Zandspruit, Gauteng. He served as a Member of Parliament from 1999 to 2014. Although he stood for re-election to the National Assembly in the 2014 general election, he was ranked 31st on the ANC's regional party list for Gauteng and therefore did not secure a seat.

In the next general election in 2019, he stood for election to a seat in the Gauteng Provincial Legislature, but he was ranked 40th on the ANC's list and again did not initially secure a seat. However, after a casual vacancy arose in the ANC caucus, he was sworn in as a Member of the Provincial Legislature on 21 August 2020. In July 2022, he was elected to a five-year term on the Provincial Executive Committee of the Gauteng ANC.

References

External links 

 

African National Congress politicians
Living people
Year of birth missing (living people)
Members of the Gauteng Provincial Legislature
Members of the National Assembly of South Africa
21st-century South African politicians